Here Cum Germs is the fifth studio album by English gothic rock band Alien Sex Fiend, released in 1987 by Anagram Records.

Reception 

Trouser Press described the album as "hastily recorded but competent".

Track listing

References

External links 

 

Alien Sex Fiend albums
1987 albums